John Joseph "Jackie" Rea (6 April 1921 – 20 October 2013) was a Northern Irish snooker player. He was the leading Irish snooker player until the emergence of Alex Higgins.

Rea reached the semi-final of the 1952 World Championship losing to Fred Davis. With interest in professional snooker in decline he was one of four entries for the 1957 World Championships, losing to John Pulman in the final. He won the 1954/1955 News of the World Snooker Tournament, winning all his 8 matches and taking the first prize of £500. He continued playing professional snooker for many years, making his final appearances in 1990.

Career
Rea was born in Dungannon, County Tyrone and began playing snooker at age 9 in the billiard room of the pub his father managed in Dungannon. He won the All-Ireland Snooker Championship in 1947 and also the Northern Ireland Amateur Championship the same year. Rea became the Irish Professional Champion in 1947 through his defeat of Jack Bates and held the championship until he was defeated by Alex Higgins in January 1972. Rea held Higgins to 5–4 after the first session, but Higgins pulled away to win 28–12, the last scheduled session was not required (and played as an exhibition match).

Rea encouraged Higgins to move to England and Higgins would rate Rea's help so highly that he described him as 'a bit of a father figure'. Higgins would also later go move to Cheadle, close to Rea. in 1981 (see p. 158).</ref> Rea claimed that once, after Higgins had insulted Rea's wife Betty, Rea (who had been in the Commandos) "laid [Higgins] out". Higgins later apologised profusely, and Rea said that they remained strong friends.

When Alex Higgins married Lynn Hough on 5 January 1980, Rea was one of six people who held an arch of cues under which the couple walked as they left the United Reformed Church in Wilmslow, Cheshire. The other five people being John Virgo, John Smyth, David Taylor, Bruce Donkin and actor Gareth Hunt.

Rea first appeared in the World Championship in 1949, when he lost 18–17 to Conrad Stanbury in the second qualifying round. He didn't enter again until 1952 when he won two matches before losing to Fred Davis in the semi-final. He lost to John Pulman in the 1953 championship and again in the 1954 championships, losing this latter match just 31–30. He lost to Pulman again in 1956, separated by a loss to Fred Davis in a 1955 semi-final after beating Harry Stokes. By 1957 interest in snooker was ebbing and there just four entries for the World Title. Rea easily defeated Kingsley Kennerley in the semi-final 25–12 and ran John Pulman close before losing 39–34.

Rea was runner up in the 1952/53 News of the World Tournament. With a variety of starts, Rea won 5 of his 8 matches with a frames tally of 173 won to 123 lost. Rea therefore received a cheque for £300. Rea would go one better in 1954/55 and would secure that year's event by winning all his eight matches, with a tally of 174 frames won and 122 lost. Only Joe Davis had previously won all his eight matches (during the 1953 event). His win gave him a cheque for £500 and allowed his share of the gate at Leicester Square Hall to rise to 20%.

Rea's victory at the end of the 1954/5 event is noted by Joe Davis, who had been grateful to Rea for presenting him with a silver cigarette stand upon Davis making his 500th century break at Leicester Square on 18 February 1953. Rea's prime coincided with a huge decline in support for snooker. Such a decline was sped up by the closure of Snooker's 'shop window' Leicester Square Hall at the end of January 1955. Rea was present for the final night of the hall.

Rea was in his prime during a period when snooker players had to rely on exhibition bookings for their income. He made his exhibitions attractive by using comedy during them, indeed Jack Karnehm described Rea "as much as comedian as a snooker player". Virgo has admitted his snooker impressions were inspired by Rea.

1969 to retirement
He was one of the eight original players in the first two Pot Black series which started in 1969. Rea competed in the revived 1969 World Championship, losing 25–17 to Gary Owen. In the following championship, Rea faced defending champion John Spencer and Spencer achieved a winning lead at 31–15, which he extended to 37–17 as the 'dead' frames were still played out. Rea responded by winning all 7 of the frames of the last session. Rea entered the championship for most of the next 20 years, but his appearances became more sporadic from the late 1970s and he enjoyed only modest success.

Following his 19–11 first round defeat to Alex Higgins in the 1972 World Championship, Rea was forced into the qualifying competition. The closest he would come to qualification after this came in 1976 when he defeated Ian Anderson 8–5 and Bernard Bennett 8–5 only to lose in the deciding frame 8–7 to David Taylor in the final qualifying round. At the start of 1976, Rea had been one of the guests who took part in Ray Reardon's This Is Your Life programme.

In the qualifying round for the 1977 World Championship, Rea looked as if he might cause an upset when he led Doug Mountjoy, at the time Benson and Hedges Masters Champion, 8–6 and 9–8. Despite being a qualifying match, 400 people watched the conclusion of the match in which Mountjoy finally triumphed 11–9.

Rea also took part in the first World Challenge Cup. He joined Alex Higgins and Dennis Taylor to make up the Northern Ireland team. Rea was only able to win one of his frames and the team ended up in third place.

Before going out to play in the 1980 World Championship, Rea declared he would engage his all-out attacking style from the 1950s. Such a tactic overwhelmed Bernard Bennett 9–1 in his first qualifying match, but he lost to an in-form Willie Thorne 9–1 for a place at the Crucible Theatre. He defeated future world champion Joe Johnson 2–0 on his way to the quarter finals of the Bass/Golden Leisure Classic in 1982, where he lost to eventual champion Rex Williams.

In the 1985 Irish Professional Championship, Rea won the last three frames to defeat Jack McLaughlin (a future winner of the event) 6–5. He then ran into Dennis Taylor (who would win the world title 20 days later) and despite a couple of close frames, lost 6–0. Rea would take £750 as a losing quarter-finalist.

In 1987 Rea was given a special award by the WPBSA (the first such award since 1984). That same year in the Mercantile Credit Classic, Rea beat Billy Kelly 5–3 in the first qualifying round and then had a chance to play the man who would dominate snooker over the next decade, Stephen Hendry. Rea lost 5–1, losing two other close frames.

In September 1987 Rea defeated Pascal Burke 5–1 and Geoff Foulds 5–4 in the first two qualifying rounds of the Fidelity International, but was swamped 5–0 by John Spencer in the third round. One month later Rea defeated Mike Watterson 9–6 in the first round of the UK Open and held Bob Chaperon to 7–6 in the following round, before losing 9–6.

His final appearance in the World Championship came in 1990 when he defeated Pascal Burke 10–4 in the first qualifying round. His next match provided a bizarre and sad conclusion to his playing career. He led Canadian Marcel Gauvreau 6–3 at the mid-session, but the match progressed to 9–9. Rea led 71 points to 17 in the deciding frame with only 43 points remaining on the table, but Gauvreau clawed his way back to win the deciding frame.

After fifty years, Rea retired from competitive play, being at the time the second-oldest active professional player (behind Fred Davis). In retirement he agreed to coach local youngsters in his local club, Hazel Grove Snooker Club.

Performance and rankings timeline

Post-war

Modern era

Career titles

Non-ranking titles (30)
Irish Professional Championship 1947–52, 1952–71 (26 times)
News of the World Tournament Qualifying Event: 1952/53
News of the World Tournament 1954/55
Chester Professional Tournament 1969, 1970

Amateur titles (3)
Northern Ireland Amateur Championship: 1947
All-Ireland Amateur Championship: 1947, 1948

References

1921 births
2013 deaths
British Army personnel of World War II
British Army soldiers
People from Dungannon
Snooker players from Northern Ireland
Sportspeople from County Tyrone